Elizabeth Jane Howard, Lady Amis  (26 March 1923 – 2 January 2014), was an English novelist, author of 12 novels including the best-selling series The Cazalet Chronicles.

Early life
Howard's parents were timber-merchant Major David Liddon Howard MC (1896–1958), son of timber-merchant Alexander Liddon Howard (1863-1946), and Katharine Margaret ('Kit') Somervell (1895–1975), a dancer with Sergei Diaghilev's Ballets Russes and daughter of the composer Sir Arthur Somervell. (One of her brothers, Colin, lived with her and her third husband, Kingsley Amis, for 17 years.) Mostly educated at home, she briefly attended Francis Holland School before attending domestic-science college at Ebury Street and secretarial college in central London.

Career
Howard worked briefly as an actress in provincial repertory and occasionally as a model before her writing career, which began in 1947.

The Beautiful Visit (1950), Howard's first novel, was described as "distinctive, self-assured and remarkably sensual", and won the John Llewellyn Rhys Prize in 1951 for best novel by a writer under 30. She next collaborated with Robert Aickman, writing three of the six short stories in the collection We Are for the Dark (1951).

Her second novel, The Long View (1956), describes a marriage in reverse chronology; Angela Lambert remarked, "Why The Long View isn't recognised as one of the great novels of the 20th century I will never know." Five further novels followed before she embarked on her best known work, the Cazalet Chronicles. As Artemis Cooper describes it: “Jane had two ideas, and could not decide which to embark on; so she invited her stepson Martin [Amis] round for a drink to ask his advice. One idea was an updated version of Sense and Sensibility … the other was a three-volume family saga … Martin said immediately, “Do that one.” 

The Chronicles were a family saga "about the ways in which English life changed during the war years, particularly for women." They follow three generations of a middle-class English family and draw heavily on Howard's own life and memories. The first four volumes, The Light Years, Marking Time, Confusion, and Casting Off, were published from 1990 to 1995. The fifth, All Change, was written in just a year and published in 2013; it was her final novel. Millions of copies of the Cazalet Chronicles were sold worldwide.

The Light Years and Marking Time were serialised by Cinema Verity for BBC Television as The Cazalets in 2001. A BBC Radio 4 version in 45 episodes was also broadcast from 2012.

Howard wrote the screenplay for the 1989 movie Getting It Right, directed by Randal Kleiser, based on her 1982 novel of the same name, as well as TV scripts for Upstairs, Downstairs.

She also wrote a book of short stories, Mr. Wrong (1975), and edited two anthologies, including The Lover's Companion (1978).

Autobiography and biographies
Howard's autobiography, Slipstream, was published in 2002. A biography, entitled Elizabeth Jane Howard: A Dangerous Innocence by Artemis Cooper, was published by John Murray in 2017. A reviewer said it was "strongest in the case it makes for the virtues of Howard's fiction".

Personal life
Howard married Peter Scott in 1942, at age 19, and they had a daughter, Nicola (born 1943). Howard left Scott in 1946 to become a writer, and they were divorced in 1951. At this time she was employed as part-time secretary to the pioneering canals conservation organisation the Inland Waterways Association, where she met and collaborated with Robert Aickman. She had an affair with Aickman, described in her autobiography Slipstream (2002).

Her second marriage, to Australian broadcaster Jim Douglas-Henry in 1958, was brief. Her third marriage, to novelist Kingsley Amis, whom she met while organising the Cheltenham Literary Festival, lasted from 1965 to 1983; for part of that time, 1968–1976, they lived at Lemmons, a Georgian house in Barnet, where Howard wrote Something in Disguise (1969). Her stepson, Martin Amis, has credited her with encouraging him to become a more serious reader and writer.

In later life, she lived in Bungay, Suffolk, and was appointed CBE in 2000. She died at home on 2 January 2014, aged 90.

Works
 Winner of the John Llewellyn Rhys Prize
 (a collection containing three stories by Howard and three by Robert Aickman) 

 
 
 

 (contains the three stories included in We Are for the Dark, plus "Mr Wrong")

References

Further reading 

 Elizabeth Jane Howard: Overview, Orlando (website), Cambridge University Press, accessed 1 November 2010, archived by WebCite on 31 October 2010.
 "Elizabeth Jane Howard", BBC Radio 4, 29 October 2002, accessed 1 November 2010.
 Millard, Rosie. "The beauty and the psycho", The Times, 12 October 2008, accessed 1 November 2010.

External links

Elizabeth Jane Howard on Desert Island Discs
 

1923 births
2014 deaths
Amis family
Commanders of the Order of the British Empire
English women novelists
Fellows of the Royal Society of Literature
John Llewellyn Rhys Prize winners
Writers from London
English autobiographers
British waterways activists
20th-century English novelists
20th-century English women writers
Elizabeth Jane
Wives of knights